Jiří Vokněr (12 May 1931 – 29 May 2018) is a Czechoslovak sprint canoer who competed in the mid to late 1950s. He won three medals at the ICF Canoe Sprint World Championships with one gold (1954: C-1 10000 m) and two silvers (1958: C-1 1000 m, C-1 10000 m).

Vokněr also finished fourth in the C-1 10000 m event at the 1956 Summer Olympics in Melbourne.

References

 Sports-reference.com profile

1931 births
Canoeists at the 1956 Summer Olympics
Czechoslovak male canoeists
Czech male canoeists
2018 deaths
Olympic canoeists of Czechoslovakia
ICF Canoe Sprint World Championships medalists in Canadian